Itzhak Schneor (11 December 1925 – 20 November 2011) was an Israeli footballer and manager. The peak of his managerial career was when he, alongside Ya'akov Grundman jointly coached Israel from 1988 to 1992, and were one goal short of qualifying for the 1990 World Cup.

Honours

As a player
Israeli championship (4):
1949–50, 1951–52, 1953–54, 1955–56
Israel State Cup (3):
1942, 1954, 1955

As a manager
Israeli championship (3):
1971–72, 1972–73, 1985–86

References

1925 births
2011 deaths
Israeli Jews
Israeli footballers
Maccabi Tel Aviv F.C. players
Association football defenders
Israeli football managers
Burials at Yarkon Cemetery
Israel international footballers
Polish emigrants to Israel
Maccabi Jaffa F.C. managers
Maccabi Sha'arayim F.C. managers
Hapoel Hadera F.C. managers
Bnei Yehuda Tel Aviv F.C. managers
Hapoel Petah Tikva F.C. managers
Beitar Tel Aviv F.C. managers
Beitar Jerusalem F.C. managers
Hakoah Ramat Gan F.C. managers
Shimshon Tel Aviv F.C. managers
Maccabi Netanya F.C. managers
Maccabi Tel Aviv F.C. managers
Hapoel Tel Aviv F.C. managers
Israel national football team managers
1956 AFC Asian Cup players